Puerto Rico Highway 111 (PR-111) is a highway connecting Aguadilla, Puerto Rico at Puerto Rico Highway 2 and Puerto Rico Highway 115 to Utuado, Puerto Rico at Puerto Rico Highway 140.

Route description
It is the main highway to Moca and San Sebastián, being a two-lane highway before turning rural on its way to Lares, where it meets PR-129, which taking north goes to Arecibo and meets PR-2 and PR-22. In Lares, it becomes a divided avenue, replacing an old, narrow segment, but then becomes rural again. It continues to Utuado, crossing PR-10, and merging shortly with PR-123. It ends at PR-140 east of Utuado, near Jayuya. It is one of two long highways going west–east through the center of Puerto Rico (the other being PR-156). It is named the Carretera Enrique Laguerre through all its length.

Major intersections

Related routes
Currently, PR-111 has three branches in its old segments in San Sebastián, Lares and Utuado, and previously had another in Aguadilla. Originally they were identified as PR-111R.  There are projects for Highway 111 listed on the Transportation Improvement Program for fiscal years 2017–2020, involving reconstructing, relocating and widening parts of the highway.

Puerto Rico Highway 1111

Puerto Rico Highway 1111 (PR-1111) is the old section of PR-111 through downtown Lares. This road can be seen as Puerto Rico 111 Business.

Puerto Rico Highway 4111

Puerto Rico Highway 4111 (PR-4111) is an old segment of PR-111 that provides access to a small residential area in Piedras Blancas, San Sebastián, Puerto Rico.

Puerto Rico Highway 6111

Puerto Rico Highway 6111 (PR-6111) is the original route of PR-111 through downtown Utuado. Like PR-1111, this road can be seen as Puerto Rico 111 Business.

See also

 List of highways numbered 111

References

External links

 Repavimentarán la PR-111 

111